Little Earthquakes is a VHS video released by singer/songwriter Tori Amos in 1992, which serves as Amos' first video release. The release contains all four music videos released in conjunction with Amos' debut solo album of the same name interspersed
with live performances and interview footage.

The video, out of print as of 2005, is packaged in a regular cardboard video box and was released by A*Vision Videos, a subsidiary of Atlantic Records, with a catalogue number of 50335-3. 

The contents are:

 Silent All These Years (Music Video)
 Leather (Live)
 Precious Things (Live)
 Crucify (Music Video)
 Me and a Gun (Live on Japanese Television)
 Little Earthquakes (Live)
 China (Music Video)
 Happy Phantom (Live)
 Here. In My Head (Live)
 Winter (Music Video)
 Song for Eric (Live)

See also
Little Earthquakes (album)

Tori Amos video albums
1992 video albums
Live video albums
1992 live albums